The 2019 Queensland Cup season was the 24th season of Queensland's top-level statewide rugby league competition run by the Queensland Rugby League. The competition, known as the Intrust Super Cup due to sponsorship from Intrust Super, featured 14 teams playing a 27-week long season (including finals) from March to September.

The Burleigh Bears won their fourth premiership after defeating the Wynnum Manly Seagulls 28–10 in the Grand Final at Dolphin Stadium. Burleigh  Jamal Fogarty was named the competition's Player of the Year, winning the Petero Civoniceva Medal.

Teams
In 2019, the lineup of teams remained unchanged for the fifth consecutive year.

Ladder

Final series
For the first time in competition history, the Queensland Cup used an eight-team finals series in 2019, the same format used in the NRL.

Grand Final

Wynnum Manly finished the regular season in second and were defeated by third-placed Burleigh in the second qualifying final. They then eliminated defending premiers Dolphins in the semi final and travelled to Townsville, where they defeated the Blackhawks in the preliminary final to qualify for their third Grand Final. After defeating Wynnum Manly in the qualifying final, Burleigh earned a week off and faced minor premiers the Sunshine Coast, who they beat 20–6 to qualify for their sixth Grand Final.

First half
Burleigh got the scoring underway in the Grand Final, kicking a penalty goal in the 14th minute. They scored the first try of the game six minutes later when winger Tyronne Roberts-Davis scored in the left corner untouched. Another try in the 30th minute extended their lead to 12 after Jamal Fogarty grubbered through the line and regathered, finding Kurtis Rowe in support, who scored next to the posts. Wynnum Manly finally got on the scoreboard in the 34th minute, when halfback Sam Scarlett dived on his own kick after a Burleigh error in the in-goal.

Second half
Wynnum opened the second half strongly, with a try to winger Edward Burns from a Patrick Templeman kick, bringing them within two points of Burleigh. The Bears hit back shortly after, when Rowe caught a bouncing Dylan Phythian kick to score his second try of the game. In the 67th minute, hooker Pat Politoni extended Burleigh's lead to 12 when he darted over from dummy half to score. Burleigh sealed the victory, and their fourth premiership, when Fogarty picked up a Seagulls' kick and ran 90 metres untouched to score under the posts. Kurtis Rowe was awarded the Duncan Hall Medal for man of the match for his two-try effort.

NRL State Championship

After winning the Grand Final, the Burleigh Bears qualified for the NRL State Championship on NRL Grand Final day. They were defeated by the Newtown Jets, the New South Wales Cup premiers, 16–20.

Player statistics
The following statistics are as of the conclusion of the season (including finals).

Leading try scorers

Leading point scorers

QRL awards
 Petero Civoniceva Medal (Best and Fairest): Jamal Fogarty ( Burleigh Bears)
 Coach of the Year: Eric Smith ( Sunshine Coast Falcons)
 Rookie of the Year: Tom Gilbert ( Townsville Blackhawks)
 Representative Player of the Year: Xavier Coates ( Queensland under-18,  Tweed Heads Seagulls)

Team of the Year

See also

 Queensland Cup
 Queensland Rugby League

References

2019 in Australian rugby league
Queensland Cup